Australian women's cricket team toured New Zealand in February–March 1948. Australians won the Test series by 1-0. Australians also played seven tour matches.

WTest Series

Only WTest

References 

1948 in women's cricket
1948 in Australian cricket
1948 in New Zealand cricket
New Zealand 1948
Australia 1948
February 1948 sports events in New Zealand
March 1948 sports events in New Zealand